Intec can refer to:

 Intec Digital, a record label
 Intec College, South Africa
 INTEC Education College, Malaysia
 Instituto Tecnológico de Santo Domingo, Dominican Republic

See also 
 Intech (disambiguation)